Princess Donna is the stage name of the American pornographic actress and director also known as Donna Dolore. She was director of Wired Pussy and founder of Public Disgrace and Bound Gang Bang, all Kink.com brands.

She majored in gender and sexuality studies and photography at New York University. While there, she began working as a stripper, and began doing professional BDSM shoots following a coworker's recommendation.

Along with fellow Kink actress and director Lorelei Lee, Princess Donna was the subject of Brian Lilla's 2007 independent film Tale of Two Bondage Models, which appeared at the 2008 Tribeca Film Festival.

Princess Donna identifies as queer, telling The Village Voice in 2008: "I'm everything but straight."

She has received AVN Award nominations as both a director and actress.

References

External links

 
 
 

Living people
American female erotic dancers
American erotic dancers
American pornographic film actresses
American pornographers
Bondage models
Culture of San Francisco
Women pornographic film directors
Queer dancers
American LGBT actors
Queer pornographic film actors
Pornographic film actors from California
American sex educators
Tisch School of the Arts alumni
LGBT film directors
Queer feminists
Sex-positive feminists
Queer women
LGBT people from California
LGBT people from New York (state)
1982 births